Carlos Banteur Suárez (born October 13, 1986) is a Cuban amateur boxer from Santiago de Cuba best known for qualifying for the 2008 Olympics at welterweight. His name is sometimes misspelled Banteaux, Banteaur or Banteux by some sources outside Cuba.

Career
Banteur won the 64 kg World Junior Championships 2004, but struggled at senior level for years at junior welter even nationally. His best result was a second place in 2006 vs Inocente Fiss, in 2007 he again exited early.

After the failed defection of dominant welterweight world champion Erislandy Lara, however, Lara was sidelined and the division was wide open. Banteur moved up and won the 2008 nationals immediately with a clear 15:6 final win over veteran Yudel Johnson.

He won the Dominican Copa Independencia and dominated his four bouts at the Olympic qualifier routing Óscar Molina 19:4 in the all-important semifinal. In the meaningless final he also beat fellow qualifier John Jackson 12:2.

At the Olympics Banteur defeated Hosam Abdin to reach the medal rounds.

Olympic Games
2008 in Beijing, China (light welterweight)
1st round bye
Defeated Billy Joe Saunders (Great Britain) 13-6
Defeated Hosam Bakr Abdin (Egypt) 10-2
Defeated Kanat Islam (China) 17-4
Lost to Bakhyt Sarsekbayev (Kazakhstan) 18-9

World Cup
2005 in Moscow, Russia (light welterweight)
Lost to Kanat Orakbayev (Kazakhstan) 36–44
Lost to Oleg Komissarov (Russia) 25–30

External links
 2004 World Juniors
 Nationals 2008
 Olympic qualifier
 

Living people
1986 births
Olympic boxers of Cuba
Welterweight boxers
Boxers at the 2008 Summer Olympics
Boxers at the 2011 Pan American Games
Olympic silver medalists for Cuba
Sportspeople from Santiago de Cuba
Olympic medalists in boxing
Medalists at the 2008 Summer Olympics
Cuban male boxers
Pan American Games gold medalists for Cuba
Pan American Games medalists in boxing
Medalists at the 2011 Pan American Games